Juhdum is a Palestinian village located eight kilometers east of Bethlehem.The village is in the Bethlehem Governorate Southern West Bank. According to the Palestinian Central Bureau of Statistics, the village had a population of 1,391 in mid-year 2006.

Footnotes

Villages in the West Bank
Bethlehem Governorate
Municipalities of the State of Palestine